For this election, Marie Stærke from the Social Democrats was seeking re-election and a fourth term, after having won the mayor's position following the last election.  

In the election result, the Social Democrats would be the largest party with 10 seats against second-place Venstre who won 6 seats. Eventually Venstre ended giviving up on winning the mayor's position. Instead they reached an untraditional agreement with the Social Democrats, that would have Marie Stærke continue as mayor. Other parties in the agreement, included - the Green Left, Danish People's Party and the Red–Green Alliance.

Electoral system
For elections to Danish municipalities, a number varying from 9 to 31 are chosen to be elected to the municipal council. The seats are then allocated using the D'Hondt method and a closed list proportional representation.
Køge Municipality had 27 seats in 2021

Unlike in Danish General Elections, in elections to municipal councils, electoral alliances are allowed.

Electoral alliances  

Electoral Alliance 1

Electoral Alliance 2

Electoral Alliance 3

Electoral Alliance 4

Results

References 

Køge